is a Japanese para badminton player. He competed in the men singles SU5 event of the 2020 Summer Paralympics.

He won a bronze medal in the men's singles SU5 at the 2017 BWF Para-Badminton World Championships.

Achievements

World Championships 
Men's singles

Asian Championships 
Men's singles

Asian Youth Para Games 
Men's singles

Men's doubles

BWF Para Badminton World Circuit (2 titles, 3 runners-up) 
The BWF Para Badminton World Circuit – Grade 2, Level 1, 2 and 3 tournaments has been sanctioned by the Badminton World Federation from 2022.

Men's singles

Mixed doubles

International Tournaments (4 titles, 7 runners-up) 
Men's singles

Men's doubles

Mixed doubles

References

Notes 

1998 births
Living people
People from Aichi Prefecture
Japanese male badminton players
Japanese para-badminton players
Paralympic badminton players of Japan
Badminton players at the 2020 Summer Paralympics
21st-century Japanese people